Mayim Mayim ("water, water") is an Israeli folk dance, danced to a song of the same name. It has become notable outside the Israeli dancing community and is often performed at international folk dance events.

History
The dance was created in 1937 for a festival to celebrate the discovery of water in the desert after a seven-year search. The choreographer was Else I. Dublon.

The dance is sometimes known as "Ushavtem Mayim", after the first words of the lyrics, or simply just "Mayim", but "Mayim Mayim" is the original and most common name. The movement to the first four counts has become known as the "Mayim step" and is similar to the grapevine step found in other forms of dance.

"Mayim Mayim" is done in a circle formation, facing the center through most of the dance, and holding hands except when clapping.

The song
The music for Mayim Mayim was composed by Emanuel Pugashov Amiran with lyrics taken from the Book of Isaiah, chapter 12 verse 3, "Joyfully shall you draw water from the fountains of triumph".

Ushavtem mayim b'sason mimainei hayeshua
Ushavtem mayim b'sason mimainei hayeshua

Mayim mayim mayim mayim, hey, mayim b'sason
Mayim mayim mayim mayim, hey, mayim b'sason

Hey, hey, hey, hey
Mayim mayim mayim mayim mayim mayim b'sason
Mayim mayim mayim mayim mayim mayim b'sason

Appearances in gaming
An 8 bit arrangement appears in the Game Boy Camera's Ball minigame.
A 16 bit arrangement appears in the Super Famicom port of ClockWerx.
A remixed version appears in Konami's Sexy Parodius.

See also
Israeli dance

References

Further reading
 Goldschmidt, Matti: The Bible in Israeli Folk Dances, Viersen 2001

Dance in Israel
Circle dances